Manchester Congo Mouilla or simply Manchester is an African football club based in Republic of the Congo.

The team plays in the Congo Second Division.

Stadium
The team plays at the Stade Alphonse Massemba-Débat.

Performance in CAF competitions
 CAF Cup: 2 appearances
2002: First Round
2001: First Round

Notable players
Barel Mouko

References

Football clubs in the Republic of the Congo
Sports clubs in Brazzaville